is a national government park located on the  of the town of Namegawa, Saitama Prefecture, Japan. It is also known as a National forest park. In 1974, it opened as the first National Government Park. The park covers a vast area of forest and offers opportunities for various outdoor activities. The park has four entrances: the Central, North, West, and South Entrances.

Features
The park provides a variety of opportunities for outdoor activities and takes days to fully explore the entire park grounds.  The park features bike trails, walking paths, flower and herb gardens, athletic grounds, nature walks, a cross-country running course, a marathon course,  an orienteering course, a disk golf course, off-leash areas for dogs  and ropes courses for children.  Picnic grounds and restaurants are also available.  With reservations, a variety of educational activities for outdoors are also offered by volunteering staff.

Access

By car
 10 minutes toward Kumagaya from the Kan-Etsu Expressway, on Higashimatsuyama Interchange.

By train
Getting off at Tōbu Tōjō Line Shinrinkōen Station and 7 minutes by bus to Shinrin Kōen Stop
Getting off at JR Takasaki Line Kumagaya Station and roughly 40 minutes by bus to Shinrin Kōen Stop

References

External links

Musashi Kyūryō National Government Park Official website

National Government Parks of Japan
Parks and gardens in Saitama Prefecture
Forest parks in Japan